The Australian Football Harmony Cup is an amateur Australian rules football competition featuring teams drawn from Melbourne's migrant communities.  The tournament is coordinated by Australian Football International.

It was first held in 2004 in Melbourne around National Harmony Day.

Background
Australian Football is also known for a high participation rate amongst migrants, particularly amongst Europeans.  Many such players reach the highest levels and some like Ron Barassi, Stephen Silvagni, Robert DiPierdomenico and Alex Jesaulenko are legends of the game.  Some Australian Football League clubs, such as Carlton are renowned for the high number of players of Mediterranean origin.

Teams
The Harmony Cup has included teams representing multicultural communities from Albania, Chile, Croatia, Israel, Ireland, Greece, Italy, Lebanon, Malta, Macedonia, Netherlands, New Zealand, Poland, Samoa, South Sudan, Spain, Switzerland, Tonga, Wales, Vietnam and Turkey.  A side drawn from the Melbourne Aboriginal community has also competed at the Harmony Cup.  Teams under the banner of "United Nations", "Team Harmony" and "Team Africa" have also competed at the Harmony Cup.

History
The first Harmony Cup was held in 2004 at Skinner Reserve, Braybrook in 2004, with Israel 8.9 (57) defeating Samoa 1.0 (6) in the Grand Final.

The 2005 Harmony Cup was won by Greece 5.5 (35) over Turkey 3.3 (21) in front of a crowd of 2,300 at Optus Oval in Carlton, Melbourne.

The Harmony Cup returned in 2010 and has been held every year since.

Results

See also

List of VFL/AFL players by ethnicity
List of overseas-born AFL players

References

External links
 Official Harmony Cup Cup website

Australian rules football competitions in Australia
International Australian rules football tournaments